Chris B. Hunter (born July 3, 1987) is an American actor who is most known for co-starring in The N original series South of Nowhere as Glen Carlin. He has also made guest appearances in other shows including 7th Heaven, Boston Public, That's So Raven, Phil of the Future, Just for Kicks and The Amanda Show. He also co-starred in the Disney Channel Original Movie Buffalo Dreams.

Hunter was born in Tacoma, Washington, and knew his co-star Eileen Boylan before they starred together in South of Nowhere.

Television

External links

1987 births
Living people
21st-century American male actors
Male actors from Tacoma, Washington
American male child actors
American male television actors